The Chief Minister of Rajasthan is the chief executive of the Indian state of Rajasthan. In accordance with the Constitution of India, the governor is a state's de jure head, but de facto executive authority rests with the chief minister. Following elections to the Rajasthan Legislative Assembly, the state's governor usually invites the party (or coalition) with a majority of seats to form the government. The governor appoints the chief minister, whose council of ministers are collectively responsible to the assembly. Given the confidence of the assembly, the chief minister's term is for five years and is subject to no term limits.

From 1949, 13 people have been Chief Minister of Rajasthan. Vasundhara Raje Scindia of the Bharatiya Janata Party is only female to serve as the chief minister of the state. After securing majority in 2018 assembly election, Ashok Gehlot of the Indian National Congress assumed office on 17 December 2018.

Chief minister of Ajmer State

Chief ministers of Rajasthan

Timeline

Notes
Notes

Reference

External links

 Profile of current incumbent 
 History of Rajasthan legislature
 Ashok Gehlot
 CMs of Rajasthan

 List
Rajasthan
Chief Ministers